The 2019 AFC Champions League was the 38th edition of Asia's premier club football tournament, organized by the Asian Football Confederation (AFC), and the 17th under the current AFC Champions League title.

Al-Hilal defeated Urawa Red Diamonds 3–0 on aggregate in the final to earn a record third Champions League title. As winners, they qualified for the 2019 FIFA Club World Cup in Qatar.

Kashima Antlers were the defending champions, but were eliminated by Guangzhou Evergrande in the quarter-finals on away goals.

Association team allocation
The 46 AFC member associations (excluding the associate member Northern Mariana Islands) were ranked, based on their national team's and clubs' performance over the last four years in AFC competitions, with the allocation of slots for the 2019 and 2020 editions of the AFC club competitions determined by the 2017 AFC rankings (Entry Manual Article 2.3):
The associations were split into two regions:
West Region consisted of the associations from the West Asian Football Federation (WAFF), the Central Asian Football Association (CAFA), and the South Asian Football Federation (SAFF).
East Region consisted of the associations from the ASEAN Football Federation (AFF) and the East Asian Football Federation (EAFF).
In each region, there were four groups in the group stage, including a total of 12 direct slots, with the 4 remaining slots filled through play-offs.
The top 12 associations in each region as per the AFC rankings were eligible to enter the AFC Champions League, as long as they fulfill the AFC Champions League criteria.
The top six associations in each region got at least one direct slot in the group stage, while the remaining associations get only play-off slots (as well as AFC Cup group stage slots):
The associations ranked 1st and 2nd each got three direct slots and one play-off slot.
The associations ranked 3rd and 4th each got two direct slots and two play-off slots.
The associations ranked 5th each got one direct slot and two play-off slots.
The associations ranked 6th each got one direct slot and one play-off slot.
The associations ranked 7th to 12th each got one play-off slot.
The maximum number of slots for each association was one-third of the total number of eligible teams in the top division.
If any association gave up its direct slots, they were redistributed to the highest eligible association, with each association limited to a maximum of three direct slots.
If any association gave up its play-off slots, they were annulled and not redistributed to any other association.

Association ranking
For the 2019 AFC Champions League, the associations were allocated slots according to their association ranking which was published on 15 December 2017, which took into account their performance in the AFC Champions League and the AFC Cup, as well as their national team's FIFA World Rankings, between 2014 and 2017.

Notes

Teams
The following 51 teams from 22 associations entered the competition.

In the following table, the number of appearances and last appearance count only those since the 2002–03 season (including qualifying rounds), when the competition was rebranded as the AFC Champions League. TH means title holders.

Notes

Schedule
The schedule of the competition is as follows.

Qualifying play-offs

Preliminary round 1

Preliminary round 2

Play-off round

Group stage

Group A

Group B

Group C

Group D

Group E

Group F

Group G

Group H

Knockout stage

Bracket

Round of 16

Quarter-finals

Semi-finals

Final

Awards

Main awards

All-Star Squad 
Source:

Opta Best XI
Source:

Fans' Best XI
Source:

Top scorers

Player of the week awards

See also
2019 AFC Cup
2019 AFC Women's Club Championship

References

External links
, the-AFC.com
AFC Champions League 2019, stats.the-AFC.com

2019 in Asian football
 
2019